In linear algebra, a Hankel matrix (or catalecticant matrix), named after Hermann Hankel, is a square matrix in which each ascending skew-diagonal from left to right is constant, e.g.:

More generally, a Hankel matrix is any  matrix  of the form

Properties
 The Hankel matrix is a symmetric matrix.
 Let  be the  exchange matrix.  If  is a  Hankel matrix, then  where  is a  Toeplitz matrix. 
 If  is real symmetric, then  will have the same eigenvalues as  up to sign.
 The Hilbert matrix is an example of a Hankel matrix.

Hankel operator

A Hankel operator on a Hilbert space is one whose matrix is a (possibly infinite) Hankel matrix with respect to an orthonormal basis. As indicated above, a Hankel Matrix is a matrix with constant values along its antidiagonals, which means that a Hankel matrix  must satisfy, for all rows  and columns , .

Let the corresponding Hankel Operator be .

We are often interested in Hankel operators  over the Hilbert space , the space of square integrable bilateral complex sequences. For any , we have

We are often interested in approximations of the Hankel operators, possibly by low-order operators. In order to approximate the output of the operator, we can use the spectral norm (operator 2-norm) to measure the error of our approximation. This suggests singular value decomposition as a possible technique to approximate the action of the operator.

Note that the matrix  does not have to be finite. If it is infinite, traditional methods of computing individual singular vectors will not work directly. We also require that the approximation is a Hankel matrix, which can be shown with AAK theory.

The determinant of a Hankel matrix is called a catalecticant.

Hankel matrix transform

The Hankel matrix transform, or simply Hankel transform, produces the sequence of the determinants of the Hankel matrices formed from the given sequence.  Namely, the sequence  is the Hankel transform of the sequence  when

The Hankel transform is invariant under the binomial transform of a sequence.  That is, if one writes

as the binomial transform of the sequence , then one has

Applications of Hankel matrices 
Hankel matrices are formed when, given a sequence of output data, a realization of an underlying state-space or hidden Markov model is desired.  The singular value decomposition of the Hankel matrix provides a means of computing the A, B, and C matrices which define the state-space realization. The Hankel matrix formed from the signal has been found useful for decomposition of non-stationary signals and time-frequency representation.

Method of moments for polynomial distributions 
The method of moments applied to polynomial distributions results in a Hankel matrix that needs to be inverted in order to obtain the weight parameters of the polynomial distribution approximation.

Positive Hankel matrices and the Hamburger moment problems

See also
 Toeplitz matrix, an "upside down" (i.e., row-reversed) Hankel matrix
 Cauchy matrix
 Vandermonde matrix

Notes

References 
Brent R.P. (1999), "Stability of fast algorithms for structured linear systems", Fast Reliable Algorithms for Matrices with Structure (editors—T. Kailath, A.H. Sayed), ch.4 (SIAM).
 
 

Matrices
Transforms